Ústrašice is a municipality and village in Tábor District in the South Bohemian Region of the Czech Republic. It has about 400 inhabitants.

History
The first written mention of Ústrašice is from 1405.

References

Villages in Tábor District